was a village located in Ōnuma District, Fukushima Prefecture, Japan.

As of 2003, the village had an estimated population of 3,874 and a population density of 95.56 persons per km². The total area was 40.54 km².

On October 1, 2005, Niitsuru, along with the towns of Aizuhongō and Aizutakada (all from Ōnuma District), was merged to create the town of Aizumisato.

External links
Aizumisato official website 

Dissolved municipalities of Fukushima Prefecture
Aizumisato, Fukushima